Pendleton Heights High School, also known as "PHHS," is a public high school in Pendleton, Indiana. It is part of the South Madison Community School Corporation and has an enrollment of around 1,400 students.

History
Pendleton Heights was built in 1969 as a consolidation of Adams Township's Markleville High School and Fall Creek Township's Pendleton High School. The consolidation happened after the Indiana State Legislature passed the School Reorganization Act, causing the redistricting of school boundaries so that each student was backed by $5,000 in assessed tax evaluation. Under this Act, Markleville High school no longer qualified as a public high school. In 1959, a nine-man school reorganization committee was appointed to redistrict the school systems of Madison County.

After much discussion and many public meetings throughout the county a plan was devised that met all requirements. In southern Madison County, the new school district consisted of Green, Fall Creek and Adams Townships. The area chosen to build the new consolidated school consisted of approximately  just east of Pendleton, bordering State Road 67 and State Road 38. Central location of this site to the schools was considered in the selection. The property was sold to the school in early 1967 with construction on the new high school starting in October of that year. The original building was completed for occupancy September 1, 1969, with the first graduating class in 1970.

The school began construction on the school in 1996 with a remodeling and renovation project. The project; which consisted of a new academic wing and media center, a 900-seat auditorium and performing arts center, and an auxiliary gymnasium; was completed in Spring 1999. In Spring 2009, the 10 year anniversary of the renovation was celebrated with the "Loran G. Skinner's 10th Anniversary Gala", which featured the High School's Pendletones show choir, the PHHS Jazz Band, and revival performances of plays and musicals by previous cast members. Additional construction began in 2019, which would introduce a new athletic center, all-new weight room, and updated locker rooms.

Extra curricular activities
Pendleton Elites, an E-sports team that is a part of IHSEN
Art Club
Language Clubs (includes Spanish, French, German)
Outdoor adventure club
Academic teams

Athletics
Pendleton Heights High School is part of the Hoosier Heritage Conference.

Athletic programs
Fall
Boys' and Girls' Cross Country
Football
Girls' Golf
Boys' and Girls' Soccer
Boys' Tennis
Volleyball
Cheerleading
Marching Band
Winter
Boys' and Girls' Basketball
Boys' and Girls' Swimming & Diving
Wrestling
Cheerleading
Spring
Baseball
Softball
Boys' Golf
Girls' Tennis
Boys' and Girls' Track & Field

Band
Pendleton Heights is home to two concert bands, Wind Ensemble and Symphonic Band. Students also participate in Jazz Band, Pep Band, Indoor Percussion, or Marching Band. The Pendleton Bands are currently under the direction of Chris Taylor and co-direction of Nathan Hochstetler. In 2018 The Marching Arabians performed "Spintronics" and qualified for the ISSMA Class B State Finals at Lucas Oil Stadium for the first time in school history, placing ninth in their class. In 2019 they returned to State Finals performing the show "Being a Villain" placing tenth. In 2021 the Marching Arabians performing, "Dimensions" and advanced to ISSMA Semi-State Finals at Pike High School, just shy of qualifying for State Finals.

Choir
Pendleton Heights is home to three show choirs currently under the direction of Mrs. Erin Frick-Archer. Pendletones, the varsity mixed group, has earned multiple Grand Champion titles over their past seasons, and the unisex girls' group, Emerald Suites, had a successful 2022 season, having an undefeated record in the small unisex group. New Edition, the junior varsity unisex choir, has also participated at select competitions across the state. Both varsity choirs have qualified to compete ISSMA Show Choir State Finals in 2022. The groups are backed by a band named "Team Awesome", consisting of current students and alumni.

Broadcasting
Pendleton Heights High School is the proud host of WEEM (91.7 FM). The radio station is student-run and broadcasts in the Modern AC format, with students hosting shows. The radio program won the Indiana Association of School Broadcasters "Radio School of the Year" award in 2012.

Gay Straight alliance
Pendleton Heights High School has its own club to support their LGBTQIA+ students called the “Gay Straight Alliance”. This is to form some equality within the school. The “Gay Straight Alliance” was a part of the yearly Homecoming Parade the town celebrates. The club is inclusive and it is free to join. Recent controversies surrounding the group had been a topic of state-wide news, as the members joined with the ACLU to allow for the continuation of the club.

Other information
Pendleton Heights High School was recognized as one of the best high schools in the nation by Newsweek for 2010.

Alumni
Sean McDermott, basketball player
Kellen Dunham, basketball player
Mike Gaskill, member of the Indiana Senate
Brock Huntzinger, baseball player
Chayce McDermott, baseball player

See also
 List of high schools in Indiana
 Hoosier Heritage Conference
 Pendleton, Indiana

References

External links
 Pendleton Heights High School

Public high schools in Indiana
Schools in Madison County, Indiana
1969 establishments in Indiana